Harvey T. Carter (1932-2012) was an American rock climber noted for his hundreds of first ascents across Colorado and the Western United States. He founded Climbing magazine in 1970 from his basement with $900.

First ascents
A partial list of some notable first ascents:

 1960 - Kissing Couple
 1960 - Sentinel Spire
 1962 - The Rectory
 1965 - Sister Superior
 1965 - Convent
 1966 - Owl Rock
 1969 - "Flashflood", Haystack Mountain
 1979 - Terra Tower

References

American rock climbers
1932 births
2012 deaths